Karmegham is a 2002 Tamil language drama film directed by S. P. Rajkumar. The film stars Mammootty, Radha Ravi, and Abhirami.

Plot

Karmegham returns to his village after serving in the army for long. He finds that the villagers still live the shackles of old customs and traditions. They work as slaves to a feudal landlord who exploits them. Maheswari, a doctor, falls in love with Karmegham. Later through his mother, Karmegham learns that Radha Ravi is his father and then it becomes a father-son conflict. Karmegham stood with the villagers and opposed his father and brother Shakthi. His sister, Mangai, loves a poor villager but Sakthi and his father are against her love. Sakthi kills her sister's lover, his sister goes mad and Karmegham calls the police. His brother escapes but the police shot him in an encounter. Karmegham gets married with Maheswari. His sister and mother die in a bomb blast planned by Karmegham's father. Karmegham kills his father to save at least his village.

Cast

Mammootty as Karmegham
Abhirami as Maheswari
Vadivelu as Khanja
Radha Ravi as Karmegham's father
Manorama as Karmegham's mother
Baburaj as Police Officer
Ilavarasu as Saguni
Thalaivasal Vijay as a District Collector
Vinu Chakravarthy
C. R. Saraswathi
Mayilsamy
Singamuthu
Halwa Vasu
Bonda Mani
Muthukaalai
Alphonsa in a special appearance

Soundtrack

The film score and the soundtrack were composed by Vidyasagar. The soundtrack, released in 2002, features 6 tracks with lyrics written by P. Vijay, Yuga Bharathi, Arivumathi and Pazhani Bharathi.

Reception
Sify described the film as an "Old wine in new bottle" and wrote, "It is an old style tearjerker that lacks any freshness either by way of incidents or narration".

References

2002 films
2000s Tamil-language films
Films scored by Vidyasagar
Films directed by S. P. Rajkumar